Jelena Janković was the defending champion, but she lost in the quarterfinals to Alisa Kleybanova.

Francesca Schiavone won the title, defeating Olga Govortsova in the final 6–3, 6–0.

Seeds

Draw

Finals

Top half

Bottom half

External links
 Main Draw
 Qualifying Draw

Kremlin Cup
Kremlin Cup